The Ponmudi day gecko (Cnemaspis nairi) is a species of lizard in the family Gekkonidae. The species is endemic to India.

Etymology
The specific name, nairi, is in honor of Indian naturalist S. Madhavan Nair.

Geographic range
C. nairi is found in the Indian state of Kerala. The holotype, from which the species was originally described, was collected at Ponmudi.

Habitat

Description
Dorsally, it is gray with black and white markings. Ventrally, it is grayish brown. The tail has alternating rings of black and yellowish olive.

Reproduction
C. nairi is oviparous.

References

Further reading
Inger RF, Marx H, Koshy M (1984). "An Undescribed Species of Gekkonid Lizard (Cnemaspis) from India with Comments on the Status of C. tropidogaster ". Herpetologica 40 (2): 149–154. (Cnemaspis nairi, new species).
Rösler H (2000). "Kommentierte Liste der rezent, subrezent und fossil bekannten Geckotaxa (Reptilia: Gekkonomorpha)". Gekkota 2: 28–153. (in German).

Cnemaspis
Reptiles of India
Endemic fauna of the Western Ghats
Reptiles described in 1984
Taxa named by Robert F. Inger
Taxa named by Hymen Marx
Taxa named by Mammen Koshy